Kate Christensen (born August 22, 1962) is an American novelist. She won the 2008 PEN/Faulkner Award for Fiction for her fourth novel, The Great Man, about a painter and the three women in his life.  Her previous novels are In the Drink (1999), Jeremy Thrane (2001), and The Epicure's Lament (2004). Her fifth novel, Trouble (2009), was released in paperback by Vintage/Anchor in June 2010. Her sixth novel, The Astral, was published in hardcover by Doubleday in June 2011. She is also the author of two food-related memoirs, Blue Plate Special (Doubleday, 2013) and How to Cook a Moose (Islandport Press, 2015), which won the 2016 Maine Literary Award for memoir.

She is a graduate of Reed College and the Iowa Writers' Workshop. Her essays, articles, reviews, and stories have appeared in many anthologies and periodicals, including The New York Times Book Review, Bookforum, Elle, The Wall Street Journal, Vogue, Food & Wine, Cherry Bombe, and The Jewish Daily Forward.

Works

Fiction
 In the Drink, Doubleday, 1999, 
 Jeremy Thrane, Broadway, 2001, 
 The Epicure's Lament, Doubleday, 2004, 
 The Great Man, Doubleday, 2007, 
 Trouble, Doubleday, 2009, 
 The Astral, Doubleday, 2011, 
 The Last Cruise, Doubleday, 2018, 
 Welcome Home, Stranger, TBA

Non-fiction
 Blue Plate Special: An Autobiography of My Appetites, Doubleday, 2013, 
 How to Cook a Moose: A Culinary Memoir, Islandport Press, 2015,

References

 Contemporary Authors Online, Gale, 2004
 Robert Smith, "The Art of the Novel", Reed Magazine, Spring 2008: 14–15.

External links
 Official website
 Random House bio
 Bold Type interview

1962 births
Living people
Place of birth missing (living people)
20th-century American novelists
Reed College alumni
Iowa Writers' Workshop alumni
21st-century American novelists
PEN/Faulkner Award for Fiction winners
Waldorf school alumni
American women novelists
20th-century American women writers
21st-century American women writers